David Huron (born June 1, 1954) is a Canadian Arts and Humanities Distinguished Professor at the Ohio State University, in both the School of Music and the Center for Cognitive and Brain Sciences. His teaching and publications focus on the psychology of music and music cognition. In 2017, Huron was awarded the Society for Music Perception and Cognition Achievement Award.

Books
 Huron, D. (2016). Voice Leading: The Science behind a Musical Art. MIT Press.
 Huron, D. (2006). Sweet Anticipation: Music and the Psychology of Expectation. Cambridge, Massachusetts: MIT Press.
 Huron, D. (1999). Music Research Using Humdrum: A User's Guide. Stanford, California: Center for Computer Assisted Research in the Humanities.
 Huron, D. (1995). The Humdrum Toolkit: Reference Manual. Menlo Park, California: Center for Computer Assisted Research in the Humanities.

References

1954 births
21st-century American musicologists
Living people
American music psychologists